Jamison Covington is an American musician, mostly known for his involvement in the bands JamisonParker and E for Explosion. He is now writing and recording solo music under his name and composing/recording music for film and television.
During his career he has released 6 EPs, 3 full-length records co-produced either by Dave Trumfio or Ken Andrews and himself, had 3 music videos in rotation on MTV2 & FUSE, regular air play on college radio, toured and played shows with bands such as Something Corporate, Motion City Soundtrack, Mae, HelloGoodbye, Coheed & Cambria and many more.
Jamison officially stated his reasons for leaving Jamisonparker were due to a sharp contrast in creative views and an inability to communicate effectively. 
Jamison has also officially stated his reasons for dissolving E for Explosion were simply to move on and explore other sounds.
Jamison Covington's solo work consists of his debut EP, the first volume in his ongoing series of releases entitled Serenading Ghosts. His sound has been labeled "indie pop"and has already drawn comparisons to early Dashboard Confessional, Copeland, William Fitzsimmons and Elliott Smith. 
Jamison has also moved into the world of composing, spending the past 2 years contributing music to various shows on MTV, ABC Family, Bravo and CMT to name a few.
As of 05/13/16 (Friday the 13th), Jamison Covington announced he has teamed with Randy Strohmeyer, formerly of the band Finch, to start the band Haunted Houses.

References

American indie rock musicians
Year of birth missing (living people)
Living people